Loches is a commune in the Indre-et-Loire department, central France.

History
Loches (the Roman Leucae) grew up around a monastery founded about 500 by St. Ours and belonged to the Counts of Anjou from 886 until 1205. In the latter year it was seized from King John of England by Philip Augustus, and from the middle of the 13th century until after the time of Charles IX of France the castle was a residence of the kings of France, apart for a brief interlude in 1424 when it was heritably granted to Archibald Douglas, Duke of Touraine. Antoine Guenand, Lord of La Celle-Guenand was appointed Captain-Governor of Loches in 1441.

Population

Sights

The church of St Ours dates from the tenth century to the twelfth century; among its distinguishing features are the huge stone pyramids surmounting the nave and the beautiful carving of the west door. It contains the tomb of Agnès Sorel.

The royal lodge, built by Charles VII of France and once used as the subprefecture, contains the oratory of Anne of Brittany. It was here on 11 May 1429 that Joan of Arc arrived, fresh from her historic victory at Orleans, to meet the king.

The donjon includes, besides the ruined keep (12th century), the Martelet, celebrated as the prison of Lodovico Sforza, Duke of Milan, who died there in 1508, and the Tour Ronde, built by Louis XI of France and containing the famous iron cages in which state prisoners, including according to a story now discredited, the inventor Cardinal Balue, were confined.

Loches has a town hall and several houses of the Renaissance period.
The town hall was constructed after royal approval by Francis 1st in 1515.

On the right bank of the Indre, opposite the town, is the village of Beaulieu-lès-Loches, once the seat of a barony.

Economy
Liquor, distilling and tanning are carried on together with trade in farm produce, wine, wood and livestock.

Personalities
Loches was the birthplace of:
 Fulk III, Count of Anjou (970–1040), one of the first great builders of medieval castles.
 Alfred de Vigny (1797–1863), poet, playwright, and novelist.
 Pierre Nicolas Gerdy (1797-1856), French physician, surgeon, anatomist, pathologist  and physiologist,
 Ernest Christophe (1827–1892), sculptor, François Rude's student and a friend of Baudelaire,
 Jacques Villeret (1951–2005), actor.

International relations
Loches is twinned with:
 Wermelskirchen, Germany
 St Andrews, Fife, Scotland

See also
Château d'Armaillé
Communes of the Indre-et-Loire department

References

External links

 Tourism office website

Communes of Indre-et-Loire
Subprefectures in France
Touraine
Fortified settlements